Warchalking is the drawing of symbols in public places to advertise an open Wi-Fi network.
Inspired by hobo symbols, the warchalking marks were conceived by a group of friends in June 2002 and publicised by Matt Jones who designed the set of icons and produced a downloadable document containing them. Within days of Jones publishing a blog entry about warchalking, articles appeared in dozens of publications and stories appeared on several major television news programs around the world.

The word is formed by analogy to wardriving, the practice of driving around an area in a car to detect open Wi-Fi nodes. That term in turn is based on wardialing, the practice of dialing many phone numbers hoping to find a modem.

Having found a Wi-Fi node, the warchalker draws a special symbol on a nearby object, such as a wall, the pavement, or a lamp post. Those offering Wi-Fi service might also draw such a symbol to advertise the availability of their Wi-Fi location, whether commercial or personal.

See also 
 Hotspot (Wi-Fi)
 Mesh networking
 SSID
 Wifi analyzer
 NetStumbler
 Wardriving
 Hobo code

References

External links
 

Computer security exploits
Wi-Fi
Graffiti and unauthorised signage